Oliver Ortíz Sandoval (born 21 January 1993) is a Mexican professional footballer who plays for Correcaminos UAT of Ascenso MX on loan from Tijuana.

He played with Los Cabos of the Liga de Balompié Mexicano during the league's inaugural season in 2020–21.

References

External links
Oliver Ortíz at Official Ascenso MX site

Living people
1993 births
Mexican footballers
Association football defenders
Club Tijuana footballers
Dorados de Sinaloa footballers
Club Necaxa footballers
Leones Negros UdeG footballers
Cafetaleros de Chiapas footballers
Correcaminos UAT footballers
Liga MX players
Ascenso MX players
Tercera División de México players
People from Ensenada, Baja California
Footballers from Baja California
Liga de Balompié Mexicano players